China–Niger relations refer to the foreign relations between China and Niger. China has an embassy in Niamey and Niger has an embassy in Beijing.

Political ties

China established diplomatic relations with Niger on July 20, 1974. On June 19, 1992, the transitional government of Niger declared the reestablishment of the "diplomatic relations" with Taiwan. The Chinese Government thus announced its suspension of diplomatic relations with Niger on July 30 of the same year. On August 19, 1996, China and Niger re-established diplomatic relations.

Human rights
In June 2020, Niger was one of 53 countries that backed the Hong Kong national security law at the United Nations.

Economic ties

Chinese development finance to Niger
From 2000 to 2011, there are approximately 37 Chinese official development finance projects identified in Niger through various media reports. These projects range from developing a uranium mine complex in Azelik in 2006, to the construction of the Second bridge across the Niger river, and a $12 million debt relief in 2001.

References

 
Niger
Bilateral relations of Niger